The Wirye Line is a future tram line in Seoul, South Korea serving Wirye New Town. It will be the first tram line to run in Seoul since the closure of the city's tram system in 1968.

Stations
The names of the stations are not yet final.

Main Line

Branch line

References 

Seoul Metropolitan Subway lines